The Faculty of Philosophy, University of Oxford was founded in 2001. It is part of Oxford's Humanities Division. The faculty is located next to Somerville College on Woodstock Road. As of 2020, it is ranked 1st in the UK and 2nd in the English-speaking world by the Philosophical Gourmet Report, as well as 2nd in the world by the QS World University Rankings. It is additionally ranked first in the UK by the Complete University Guide, the Guardian, the Times, and the Independent.

History of the Faculty of Philosophy at Oxford

The present-day Faculty was formerly a sub-faculty of the Faculty of Literae Humaniores (founded in 1913), though the teaching of philosophy at Oxford dates back to medieval times. The Faculty boasts over 50 full-time philosophers in permanent posts, with at least another 50 fixed-term, emeritus and associate members. Today, it is housed within Oxford's Humanities Division.

Some of the world's greatest philosophers have studied (and taught) at Oxford, including Duns Scotus, Thomas Bradwardine, William of Ockham, John Wycliffe, Thomas Hobbes, John Locke, John Norris, Jeremy Bentham, Henry Longueville Mansel, Thomas Hill Green, F. H. Bradley, Edward Caird and in more recent times Peter Strawson, A.J. Ayer, Mary Midgley, Iris Murdoch, Thomas Nagel, Gilbert Ryle, Genevieve Lloyd, Isaiah Berlin, J. L. Austin, Celia Green, Bernard Williams, Philippa Foot, Michael A. Smith, Onora O'Neill, Michael Dummett, Derek Parfit, and Elizabeth Anscombe.

A number of eminent philosophers have also taught at Oxford, including Robert Grosseteste, Amartya Sen, and still others, including Noam Chomsky, Saul Kripke and Hilary Putnam have come to Oxford to deliver the John Locke Lectures, the Gareth Evans Memorial Lectures and other established lectures and lecture series.

The Faculty has the following statutory professorships in philosophy:

The White's Professorship of Moral Philosophy (founded in 1621)
The Waynflete Professorship of Metaphysical Philosophy (founded in 1859)
The Wykeham Professorship of Logic (founded in 1859)
The Nolloth Professorship of the Philosophy of the Christian Religion (founded in 1920)
The Professorship of Ancient Philosophy (founded in 1966)
The Wilde Professorship of Mental Philosophy (founded in 2000); formerly the Wilde Readership in Mental Philosophy (founded in 1898)
The Uehiro Professorship of Practical Ethics (founded in 2003).

Research centres

Oxford Uehiro Centre for Practical Ethics 
The Oxford Uehiro Centre for Practical Ethics was founded in 2003 by Eiji Uehiro, with the intention to "encourage and support debate and deeper rational reflection" on practical ethics. Annually, it hosts the Uehiro Lectures in Practical Ethics, a series of three lectures. The centre works to raise public awareness and engagement with ethical issues, through public lecturing and engagement, commenting and consulting in the media, in the United Kingdom and internationally. It is affiliated with the charities 80,000 Hours and Giving What We Can. The director of the centre is Julian Savulescu.

Future of Humanity Institute 

The Future of Humanity Institute (FHI) was founded in 2005 to "assess how dangerous AI and other potential threats might be to the human species".

Global Priorities Institute 
The Global Priorities Institute was founded in 2018, to investigate the question of "how to do the most good".

Notable current members

Nick Bostrom
John Broome
Harvey Brown
Roger Crisp
A. C. Grayling
Terence Irwin
Brian Leftow
A.W. Moore
William MacAskill
Jeff McMahan
Stephen Mulhall
Toby Ord
Janet Radcliffe Richards
Gonzalo Rodríguez Pereyra
Julian Savulescu
Richard Sorabji
Ralph C. S. Walker
Timothy Williamson
Mark Wrathall

Notable past members

Michael Ayers
Isaiah Berlin
Simon Blackburn
David Charles
Sir Michael Dummett
Ronald Dworkin
Philippa Foot
Peter Geach
John Hawthorne
Stuart Hampshire
R.M. Hare
J.L. Mackie
Iris Murdoch
Christopher Peacocke
W.D. Ross
Amartya Sen
Colin McGinn
Derek Parfit
Sir Geoffrey Warnock
Mary Warnock, Baroness Warnock
David Wiggins
Bernard Williams
Sybil Wolfram

References

Departments of the University of Oxford
2001 establishments in England
Philosophy departments in the United Kingdom